This is a list of AM radio stations in the United States having call signs beginning with the letters WA to WF.

WA--

WB--

WC--

WD--

WE--

WF--

See also 
 North American call sign

AM radio stations in the United States by call sign (initial letters WA-WF)